River Vamsadhara or River Banshadhara is an important east flowing river between Rushikulya and Godavari, in Odisha and Andhra Pradesh states in India.

The river originates in the border of Thuamul Rampur in the Kalahandi district and Kalyansinghpur in Rayagada district of Odisha and runs for a distance of about 254 kilometers, where it joins the Bay of Bengal at Kalingapatnam, Andhra Pradesh. The total catchment area of the river basin is about 10,830 square kilometers. The average water yield in the river basin at Gotta barrage is 115 billion cubic feet in a year.

Tourist attractions of Mukhalingam and Kalingapatnam in Srikakulam district are located on the banks of this river.
 
Mahendratanaya River is a major tributary river of Vamsadhara originating in Gajapati district of Odisha and it joins Vamsadhara in Andhra Pradesh upstream of Gotta barrage. Regulapadu reservoir in Andhra Pradesh is under construction to store the Mahendratanaya river water for irrigation use.

Interstate aspects
Vamsadhara river basin occupies 8015 square kilometers in Odisha and the remaining 2815 km2 flows in Andhra Pradesh. The river basin receives high annual average rainfall of magnitude 1400 mm. The portion lying in Rayagada district of Odisha is a predominantly hilly and tribal populated area. Andhra Pradesh and Odisha roughly estimated that 115 thousand million cubic feet (TMC) of water is available for use in the river. They entered into agreements to use the available river water in 50:50 ratio. Andhra Pradesh has taken up Gotta barrage and Neredi barrage projects to put its share of water for use. However Odisha has not taken up new projects in the basin area to utilize its share of water. In fact it is diverting Vamsadhara river waters to adjacent Rushikulya river basin by constructing Harabhangi dam without taking prior consent from Andhra Pradesh. Also, Orissa has raised objections to Neredi barrage project on the grounds of land submergence in its territory during unprecedented floods.

Approximately 25% of the available water in this basin is being utilized during the monsoon season by constructing barrages across the river. Reservoirs up to 100 Tmcft water storage capacity are to be constructed for the non-monsoon period irrigation requirements, by which 100% water utilization can be achieved.  Peculiar situation of this river is that most of the land to be irrigated is located in Andhra Pradesh while the possible storage reservoirs are located in Odisha. Vamsadhara River water disputes tribunal was constituted under Interstate River Water Disputes Act to resolve river water sharing issues between the two states. Justice Mukundakam Sharma is the chairman of Vamsadhara Water Dispute Tribunal. The tribunal pronounced its draft verdict in September 2017 and permitted AP state to construct the side weir at Katragedda and Neradi barrage. The tribunal also upheld the sharing of 115 tmc ft total yield at Gotta barrage between AP and Odisha in 50:50 ratio as per the agreement reached between the states on 30 September 1962.

In the year 2021, the Vamsadhara water disputes tribunal released its final report without much change from the draft report except sharing of available water in the river basin on yearly basis at 50:50 by both states.

Unutilized water
Nearly 82.86 TMC of water has gone waste to the sea on average in a water year from 1 June 2006 to 31 May 2022 (16 years). The yearly water unutilized is given below

The Vamsadhara Project
Boddepalli Rajagopala Rao Project was constructed on Vamsadhara river.

Vamsadhara is the main river of North Eastern Andhra. The North Eastern Andhra region consists of three North Eastern Coastal districts in Andhra Pradesh state in India. Vamsadhara project is designed to meet the irrigation needs of North Eastern Coastal Andhra.

The left main canal was completed long back. The right main canal was delayed due to various reasons. Gotta Reservoir feeds the right main canal. About 166 villages in seven mandals viz., L.N. Peta, Hiramandalam, Burja, Amadalavalasa, Gara, Sarubujjili and Srikakulam will be benefited from the RMC.

Lower Vamsadhara Project
The Lower Vamsadhara project envisages construction of 58m high & 1700m long dam across the vamsadhara river near Minajhola village (near  ) in Rayagada district creating hydraulic head of nearly 62 meters. This project would be a multipurpose project serving power generation, irrigation and flood control.

Heeramandalum reservoir
Heeramandalam reservoir of 19 TMC storage capacity is already completed but the water supply from the Vamsadhara River is yet to be made by constructing a side weir on the river. As Odisha state is not agreeing to construct the side weir even after the tribunal verdict, Andhra Pradesh state is planning to pump water into the reservoir from the nearby Gotta barrage pond. In future, Heeramandalam reservoir can be used as the lower reservoir of a 10,000 MW capacity pumped-storage hydroelectric plant to meet uninterrupted renewable and green power needs of Uttara Andhra region.

Vamsadhara and Nagavali link canal
A 30 km long gravity canal is planned to link the Vamsadhara and Nagavali Rivers. It will run from Hiramandalam reservoir to Narayanapuram barrage near Amudalavalasa and bring an additional 50,000 acres of ayacut under irrigation using 10 Tmcft of water from Vamsadhara basin.

See also 

 Nagavali River 
 Sileru River
 Krishna Water Disputes Tribunal
 Jalaput Dam
 Polavaram Project 
 Sriram Sagar Project 
 Nizam Sagar
 Balimela Reservoir 
 Penner River
 Palar River

References

Rivers of Odisha
Inter-state disputes in India
Rivers of Andhra Pradesh
Uttarandhra
Rivers of India